Isidro Chávez Espinoza (born 29 October 1981 in Angostura, Sinaloa, Mexico), better known as Espinoza Paz, is a Latin Grammy nominated Mexican musician and composer of Regional Mexican music, specializing in the styles of Banda, Norteño and Mariachi.

Early career
Espinoza Paz (Isidro Chávez Espinoza) was born on 29 October 1981 in La Angostura, a small town in the north of the state of Sinaloa, Mexico. He was 11 years old when he wrote his first song, which was dedicated to a girl with whom he had a crush. By the time he was 13, he had already written 20 songs; however, it wasn’t until his father sent him money from the United States that he decided to buy his first guitar and teach himself to play it.

Success
His big break came when he showed some of his creations to El Coyote—a popular Sinaloan banda singer—who recorded his songs "Besitos En El Cuello" ("Little Kisses On The Neck"); "Prohibido" ("Forbidden"); and "Para Impresionarte" ("To Impress You").

In December 2006, Paz met Martin Fabian, a well-known personality within the radio and music industry, who immediately foresaw the extraordinary talent within the young singer-songwriter. They soon began collaborating on his debut album "Paz En Tu Corazón" (literally, "Peace In Your Heart"—the title being a wordplay on his name). This project was released in 2007 in association with Nueva Generacion Music Group. Another independently released album, "Amigo Con Derechos" ("Friend With Benefits"), followed in 2008a recording contract with the major label Universal Latino, which released his first major label album "El Canta Autor del Pueblo" ("The Village Singer-Songwriter") in 2008 on its Machete Music subsidiary. This album featured eight previously released favorites such as "El Celular" ("The Cell Phone") and "Amigo con Derechos" ("Friend With Benefits") plus four new recordings. The single from this album, "El Proximo Viernes" ("Next Friday") reached #14 on Billboard Magazine's "Hot Latin Tracks" chart.

Soon Paz was penning songs for a long list of regional Regional artists, including Sergio Vega, La Arrolladora Banda El Limón, Banda Cuisillos, Eminem, Julio Chaidez, Banda de Jerez, Jenni Rivera, Chuy Lizarraga, Adair Elizalde, El Potro de Sinaloa, Calibre 50, Montez de Durango, Julión Álvarez, El Chapo de Sinaloa, and Duelo, among numerous others.

In 2010 he released the album "Del Rancho Para El Mundo" which included the smash hit "Al Diablo Lo Nuestro". The album was nominated for a Latin Grammy Award and was certified Gold. In 2011 he released another Gold selling album: "Canciones Que Duelen". This album debuted at #1 on the Billboard Latin Albums Chart and included the hit single "Para No Perderte". The album was also released in a deluxe version with a DVD containing several live performances.

In 2012 he released "Un Hombre Normal", a compilation album featuring some of his biggest hits, remixes and several new recordings. The title track would eventually reach #1 on the Latin Charts. During this time Paz decided to release an album of all Mariachi songs with the group Mariachi Sol De Mexico. The album which was originally titled "Las Facturas del Destino" was re-titled and was not released until 2016.

Brief Retirement
In 2012, Paz shocked fans by saying he was going to retire, after a lawsuit from his former manager. In early 2014, he switched labels from "Nueva Generacion Music Group" to "Anval Music". During this time, Paz's popularity began to decline and although he released numerous singles, he did not release a studio album until 2016.

Discography

Studio albums

Compilations

Guest appearances

Television 

2010: Los Heroes Del Norte Participacion
2010: La Academia Bicentenario Godfather of Generation 
2010: Mi Amor Por Teresa Soto...Loco Enamorado 
2011: La Voz... México (Himself / Judge)
2012: La Voz... México (Lift of Jenni Rivera)
2015: Me Pongo De Pie... Judge 
2016: Compadres (Waldo)
2018: Hijas de la luna (Himself)
2019: La Voz Kids

References

External links
Official website
Facebook
Instagram
Twitter
Wikimedia Commons hosts a multimedia category about Espinoza Paz.
Espinoza Paz at Billboard.com
 Universal Music Latin Entertainment | Espinoza Paz

Living people
Singers from Sinaloa
Writers from Sinaloa
Mexican male singer-songwriters
Mexican singer-songwriters
1981 births
Universal Music Latin Entertainment artists
Latin music songwriters
People from Dixon, California
21st-century Mexican singers
21st-century Mexican male singers
Latin music record producers